Harmar Harmar-Nicholls, Baron Harmar-Nicholls (1 November 1912 – 15 September 2000), known as Sir Harmar Nicholls, 1st Baronet, from 1960 to 1975, was a British Conservative Party politician.

Early life and career
Harmar Nicholls was born in Walsall, the son of Charles Edward Craddock Nicholls and Sarah Ann (née Wesley). He qualified as a barrister, called to the bar by Middle Temple. During World War II, he served in the Royal Engineers in India and Burma and fighting his first election as candidate for Nelson and Colne in 1945 before demobilisation, also contesting Preston in a 1946 by-election. He served as a councillor and chairman of Darlaston Urban District Council. He worked as a surveyor and as chairman of a paint company, serving as President of the Wallpaper and Paint Retailers' Association. He was a Lloyd's of London underwriter, a company director and chairman of Radio Luxembourg Ltd.

Nicholls was Member of Parliament for Peterborough from 1950 to 1974, when he lost in the October election of that year to Labour's Michael Ward, having held on by just 22 votes in the election eight months earlier. This was the second close call during his time as MP for Peterborough – in 1966, he held his seat by just three votes.  Nicholls was Parliamentary Secretary to the Ministry of Agriculture, Fisheries and Food from 1955 to 1958, and to the Ministry of Works from 1958 to 1961.  He was created a Baronet, of Darlaston in the County of Stafford, in 1960, and in 1975, after he lost his seat in the House of Commons, he was given a life peerage as Baron Harmar-Nicholls, of Peterborough in the County of Cambridgeshire, changing his surname by deed poll to allow his forename to be incorporated into his title. From 1979 to 1984, he served as Member of the European Parliament for Greater Manchester South.

Personal life
His daughter is the actress Sue Nicholls of Rentaghost and Coronation Street fame. He had no sons and the baronetcy became extinct on his death, aged 87, in September 2000.

Arms

References 

Times Guide to the House of Commons, 1950, 1966 and October 1974

External links 
 

1912 births
2000 deaths
20th-century American lawyers
Baronets in the Baronetage of the United Kingdom
British Army personnel of World War II
Conservative Party (UK) MEPs
Conservative Party (UK) MPs for English constituencies
Conservative Party (UK) life peers
Councillors in the West Midlands (county)
MEPs for England 1979–1984
Members of the Middle Temple
Ministers in the Eden government, 1955–1957
Ministers in the Macmillan and Douglas-Home governments, 1957–1964
People from Walsall
Royal Engineers officers
UK MPs 1950–1951
UK MPs 1951–1955
UK MPs 1955–1959
UK MPs 1959–1964
UK MPs 1964–1966
UK MPs 1966–1970
UK MPs 1970–1974
UK MPs 1974
UK MPs who were granted peerages
Life peers created by Elizabeth II